2021 Hazfi Cup Final was the final match of the 34th edition of Hazfi Cup that held between Esteghlal and Foolad F.C. at Naghsh-e Jahan Stadium in Isfahan.

Originally, the final was planned to be held at Imam Ali Stadium in Kerman on 9 August. On 26 July, after the draw of semi-finals, Iran Football League Organisation announced that the final match will be held one day earlier on 8 August due to beginning of Muharram. On 1 August 2021, the final venue was also changed due to problems with the field, scoreboard and seats in Imam Ali stadium. The match also played behind closed doors due to the COVID-19 pandemic in Iran.

Teams

Route to the final

Foolad

Foolad, as an Iran Pro League club, started in the Round of 32 against another Pro League side Mashin Sazi and won 3–0 with a hattrick from Luciano Pereira Mendes at Shahid Qasem Soleimani Stadium, Tabriz. In the next round, they won an Azadegan League side, Qashqai at Pars Shiraz Stadium 2–1 with both goals from Shervin Bozorg. In the quarter final round they drew 1–1 against a Pro League club Sepahan at their home stadium, Foolad Arena with a goal from Saleh Hardani in extra times and they won 5–4 in penalty shoot-outs. Mehran Mousavi, Moussa Coulibaly, Hossein Ebrahimi, Chimba and Mohammad Miri scored and Vahid Heydarieh missed their penalties while Mohsen Forouzan saved two penalties as the goalkeeper. In the semi-final they hosted against Malavan, an Azadegan League team, at Foolad Arena with a goals from Vahid Heydarieh and Ayanda Patosi.

Esteghlal

Esteghlal, as a Iran Pro League club, started in the Round of 32 against another Pro League side Paykan and won 2–1 with goals from Cheick Diabaté from penalty mark and Mohammad Daneshgar at Shohadaye Shahr-e Qods Stadium. In the next round, they faced another Pro League team ZobAhan at Azadi Stadium and they won 2–1 with goals from Farshid Esmaeili. In the quarter final round they were drawn with Persepolis to play the 96th Tehran Derby. Like previous season, Esteghlal won this derby match at Azadi Stadium 4–3 in penalty shoot-outs after the 0–0 draw during 120 minutes. Vouria Ghafouri, Farshid Esmaeili, Babak Moradi and Amir Arsalan Motahari scored and Mehdi Ghayedi missed their penalties, while Hossein Hosseini saved one penalty as the goalkeeper. In the semi-final at Azadi Stadium, Esteghlal played with Gol Gohar. Esteghlal won semi-final match 2-1 and Voria Ghafouri scored both goals from penalty mark.
Esteghlal played all of the matches before final against the teams from Iran Pro League. Except the quarter final match, which tied 0-0, they won all other matches with 2–1 score. Also, after the first match in round of 32, which was played at Shohadaye Shahr-e Qods Stadium, Esteghlal played their matches at Azadi Stadium. This means Esteghlal did not exit from Tehran Province before the Final.

Details 

{| style="width:100%; font-size:100%"
|

See also 
 2020–21 Persian Gulf Pro League
 2020–21 Azadegan League
 2020–21 Iran Football's 2nd Division
 2020–21 Iran Football's 3rd Division
 2021 Hazfi Cup
 Iranian Super Cup

References

Hazfi Cup Final
2020–21 Hazfi Cup
2021
Esteghlal F.C. matches